Sanders is an unincorporated community in northeastern Treasure County, Montana, United States, along the Yellowstone River. It lies along local roads east of the town of Hysham, the county seat of Treasure County, at an elevation of 2,602 feet (793 m). Sanders' post office first opened on March 30, 1904 and closed on October 14, 1905, only to be reopened on December 1, 1906. Although the post office finally closed on July 29, 1994, the community still has a separate ZIP code of 59076.

Climate
According to the Köppen Climate Classification system, Sanders has a semi-arid climate, abbreviated "BSk" on climate maps.

Education
The Sanders School District, established in 1907, closed in 1950. Sanders’s students were bused to Hysham.

References

Unincorporated communities in Treasure County, Montana
Unincorporated communities in Montana